Leendert Cornelis "Elco" Brinkman (born 5 February 1948) is a retired Dutch politician and businessman who served as Minister of Welfare, Health and Culture from 1982 to 1989 and Leader of the Christian Democratic Appeal (CDA) in 1994.

Career
Brinkman studied political science and law and at the Free University Amsterdam simultaneously obtaining a Master of Social Science and Laws degree. Brinkman worked as a researcher at his alma mater from September 1970 until July 1974 and as a civil servant for the Ministry of the Interior from July 1974 until November 1982. After the 1982 general election, Brinkman was appointed Minister of Welfare, Health and Culture in the First Lubbers cabinet taking office on 4 November 1982. After the election of 1986 Brinkman continued his office in the Second Lubbers cabinet. At the election of 1989 Brinkman was reelected as a member of the House of Representatives and took office on 14 September. He declined to serve in the new cabinet and instead was selected as parliamentary leader on 7 November 1989. Shortly before an upcoming election, party leader and Prime Minister Ruud Lubbers announced his retirement and Brinkman was anonymously selected as his successor on 29 January 1994. For the election of 1994 Brinkman served as lijsttrekker (top candidate) but shortly thereafter announced that he was stepping down following disappointing election results on 16 August 1994 but continued to serve in the House of Representatives as a frontbencher chairing the House Committee on Kingdom Relations and spokesperson for Health. In April 1995 Brinkman unexpectedly announced his retirement and resigned from the House of Representatives on 26 April 1995.

Brinkman retired from active politics at just 47 and became active in the private and public sectors as a corporate and non-profit director and served on several state commissions and councils on behalf of the government; he worked as a trade association executive serving as Chairman of the Construction Association from May 1995 until July 2013, Vice Chairman of the Industry and Employers Confederation (VNO-NCW) from April 2002 until May 2008 and a Member of the Social and Economic Council for the VNO-NCW from June 1995 until July 2013. Brinkman returned to active in politics and after the Senate election of 2011 was elected as a member of the Senate and became parliamentary leader serving from 7 June 2011 until 11 June 2019. Brinkman retired from active politics a second time at 71 but following his retirement continues to be active as an advocate and lobbyist for trade associations.

Decorations

References

External links

Official
  Mr.Drs. L.C. (Elco) Brinkman Parlement & Politiek
  Mr.Drs. L.C. Brinkman (CDA) Eerste Kamer der Staten-Generaal

 

 

 

 

 

 

 

1948 births
Living people
Christian Democratic Appeal politicians
Commanders of the Order of Orange-Nassau
Dutch chief executives in the finance industry
Dutch chief executives in the manufacturing industry
Dutch corporate directors
Dutch lobbyists
Dutch nonprofit directors
Dutch nonprofit executives
Dutch trade association executives
Grand Officiers of the Légion d'honneur
Leaders of the Christian Democratic Appeal
Members of the House of Representatives (Netherlands)
Members of the Senate (Netherlands)
Members of the Social and Economic Council
Ministers of Health of the Netherlands
Ministers of Sport of the Netherlands
People from Dirksland
People from Leiden
Protestant Church Christians from the Netherlands
Recipients of the Grand Cross of the Order of Leopold II
Reformed Churches Christians from the Netherlands
Vrije Universiteit Amsterdam alumni
Academic staff of Vrije Universiteit Amsterdam
20th-century Dutch businesspeople
20th-century Dutch civil servants
20th-century Dutch jurists
20th-century Dutch politicians
21st-century Dutch businesspeople
21st-century Dutch civil servants
21st-century Dutch jurists
21st-century Dutch politicians